A forestry ministry (also called a forestry agency, forestry department, or forest service) is a high, often cabinet-level government ministry charged with forestry. The ministry is often headed by a minister for forestry. Specific duties may relate to forest conservation, management, reforestation, education, forest protection, wildfire management, and related areas.

Forestry ministries by country

(Where a national forestry agency, forestry department, forest administration or parastatal corporation exists as a high-level agency within a multi-purpose ministry, it has been added to this list within parentheses.)

See also

 Central African Forest Commission
 Directorate-General for Agriculture and Rural Development (EC)
 European Forest Institute
 Food and Agriculture Organization
 International Tropical Timber Organization
 International Union for Conservation of Nature
 International Union of Forest Research Organizations
 List of agriculture ministries
 List of environmental ministries
 List of supranational environmental agencies

References 

 
 
 
Ministries
Forestry
Forestry ministries
Forestry
Ministries